Nagykunság ("Greater Cumania") is a historical and geographical region in Hungary situated in the current Jász-Nagykun-Szolnok county between Szolnok and Debrecen.  Like other historical European regions called Cumania, it is named for the Cumans, a nomadic tribe of pagan Kipchaks that settled the area. Its territory is 1,196 km².

See also
Kunság (Cumania)
Kiskunság (Little Cumania)

References

Historical regions in Hungary
Historical regions in the Kingdom of Hungary